"Name" is a song by American rock band Goo Goo Dolls. It was released in September 1995 as the third single from their fifth studio album, A Boy Named Goo (1995). "Name" became the band's first major hit, topping both the US Modern Rock Tracks chart and the Album Rock Tracks chart. It also reached number five on the Billboard Hot 100. In Canada, "Name" peaked at number two on the RPM Top Singles chart and number one on the RPM Alternative 30.

Although Goo Goo Dolls were considered an alternative group prior to the single's release, "Name" crossed over to pop and adult contemporary radio, greatly increasing the band's fan base. The band re-recorded "Name" for their compilation album, Greatest Hits Volume One: The Singles; this version featured minimal arrangements and production.

Composition
The song's unusual guitar tuning, D-A-E-A-E-E, is accomplished by replacing the B string with a high E string. In an interview with Guitar World Magazine, the singer and songwriter Johnny Rzeznik explained: "Both the top strings are high E strings. Whenever I tried tuning a regular B string up to E, it would pop. It was really tough on the tension. I've seen guys play 'Name' with regular tuning. It doesn't sound right." Rzeznik says that the song's unusual composition happened "quite accidentally". In an interview with KFOG, he explained: "It was weird, I was just sitting on my couch randomly twisting the tuning pegs, and I couldn't figure out what notes the guitar was tuned to, so I had to grab my tuner to find out, and then I jotted them down on a post it. ... I just sat there and let my fingers play the fretboard openly, and that is what became the progression of 'Name'."

In her book The Kennedy Chronicles, former MTV VJ Kennedy claimed that the song was actually about her complicated relationship with Rzeznik, with the lyrics referring to their time together and her full name being a secret to most.  Rzeznik admitted to the inspiration in the book, saying, "I was trying to capture a moment...it was pretty interesting to have a song inspired by a moment.  And I thought it was a very sweet song."

Reception
In October 2012, "Name" was ranked number 24 on Billboard's "Top 100 Pop Songs 1992–2012" chart. This chart also featured the Goo Goo Dolls' hits "Slide" (ranking at number nine) and "Iris" (which topped the chart). The Goo Goo Dolls are the only musicians to have three songs chart on the list, two breaking the top 10 and all three falling within the top 25. They are also the only musicians who have back to back singles ("Iris", 1998 and "Slide", 1999) featured on the list.

Track listings

US cassette single and Australian maxi-CD single
A1. "Name" – 4:29
B1. "Burnin' Up" – 2:29
B2. "Hit or Miss" – 2:43

European CD single
 "Name" – 4:29
 "Nothing Can Change You" – 3:11
 "I Wanna Destroy You" – 2:34

Japanese CD single
 "Name"
 "Burnin' Up"
 "Falling Down"
 "Naked"

Charts

Weekly charts

Year-end charts

All-time charts

Certifications

See also
 List of number-one mainstream rock hits (United States)
 Number one modern rock hits of 1995
 List of RPM Rock/Alternative number-one singles (Canada)

References

1990s ballads
1994 songs
1995 singles
Goo Goo Dolls songs
Post-grunge songs
Songs written by John Rzeznik
Warner Records singles
Alternative rock ballads